The 2008 Congressional election for the Delegate from Guam's At-large congressional district was held on November 4, 2008.

The non-voting delegate to the United States House of Representatives from Guam is elected for two-year terms. Incumbent Democrat Madeleine Bordallo ran unopposed and is now serving in the 111th Congress from January 4, 2009, until her term of office expires on January 3, 2011.  The election coincided with the 2008 U.S. presidential election.

Results

See also 
Guamanian general election, 2008

References

External links 
 Guam Election Commission: List of candidates for 2008 General election by office

2008
Guam
United States House of Representatives